The Bajo Barreal Formation is a geological formation in the Golfo San Jorge Basin of Chubut and Santa Cruz, Argentina whose strata date back to the Middle Cenomanian to Late Turonian. The formation was first described by Teruggi & Rossetto in 1963. The sandstones, claystones, mudstones, conglomerates and tuff were deposited in a fluvial environment. The upper part of formation is laterally equivalent to the Yacimiento El Trébol and Meseta Espinosa Formation and the lower part to the Laguna Palacios, Cañadón Seco and Comodoro Rivadavia Formations. The Bajo Barreal Formation is a reservoir rock in the Golfo San Jorge Basin.

Vertebrate paleofauna

Dinosaurs 
Indeterminate abelisauroids and titanosaurs have been recovered from the formation

Other fossils
Other fossils found in the formation include:

 Bonapartemys bajobarrealis
 Prochelidella argentinae
 Anura indet.
 Chelonia indet.
 Crocodylia indet.
 Pterosauria indet.

See also 
 List of dinosaur-bearing rock formations
 Mata Amarilla Formation, contemporaneous formation of the Austral Basin
 Lisandro Formation, contemporaneous formation of the Neuquén Basin

References

Bibliography

Further reading 
 G. Casal and L. Ibiricu. 2010. Materiales asignables a Epachthosaurus Powell, 1990 (Sauropoda: Titanosauria), de la Formación Bajo Barreal, Cretácico Superior, Chubut, Argentina [Materials assignable to Epachthosaurus Powell, 1990 (Sauropoda: Titanosauria), from the Bajo Barreal Formation, Upper Cretaceous, Chubut, Argentina]. Revista Brasileira de Paleontologia 13(3):247-256
 L. M. Ibiricu, G. A. Casal, R. D. Martinez, M. C. Lamanna, M. Luna and L. Salgado. 2013. Katepensaurus goicoecheai, gen. et sp. nov., a Late Cretaceous rebbachisaurid (Sauropoda, Diplodocoidea) from central Patagonia, Argentina. Journal of Vertebrate Paleontology 33(6):1351-1366
 L. M. Ibiricu, G. A. Casal, M. C. Lamanna, R. D. Martínez, J. D. Harris and K. J. Lacovara. 2012. The southernmost records of Rebbachisauridae (Sauropoda: Diplodocoidea), from early Late Cretaceous deposits in central Patagonia. Cretaceous Research 34:220-232
 R. D. Martínez, F. E. Novas, and A. Ambrosio. 2004. Abelisaurid remains (Theropoda, Ceratosauria) from southern Patagonia. Actas I del Congreso Ltinoamericano de Paleontología de Vertebrados. Ameghiniana 41(4):577-585
 R. D. Martínez and F. E. Novas. 1997. Un nuevo tetanuro (Dinosauria: Theropoda) de la Formación Bajo Barreal (Cretácico Superior), Patagonia [A new tetanuran (Dinosauria: Theropoda) from the Bajo Barreal Formation (Upper Cretaceous), Patagonia]. Ameghiniana 34(4):538
 R. D. Martínez, A. Maure, M. Oliva and M. Luna. 1993. Un maxilar de Theropoda (Abelisauria) de la Formación Bajo Barreal, Cretacico Tardio, Chubut, Argentina [A theropod (Abelisauria) maxilla from the Bajo Barreal Formation, Late Cretaceous, Chubut, Argentina]. Ameghiniana 30(1):109-110
 J. C. Sciutto and R. D. Martínez. 1994. Un nuevo yacimiento fosilífero de la Formación Bajo Barreal (Cretacico Tardio) y su fauna de saurópodos [A new fossiliferous locality in the Bajo Barreal Formation (Late Cretaceous) and its sauropod fauna]. Naturalia Patagonica, Ciencias de la Tierra 2:27-47

 
Geologic formations of Argentina
Cretaceous Argentina
Sandstone formations
Tuff formations
Fluvial deposits
Reservoir rock formations
Paleontology in Argentina
Geology of Chubut Province
Geology of Santa Cruz Province, Argentina
Golfo San Jorge Basin